Nort Thornton was one of the deans of college coaching in the United States and the University of California, Berkeley’s (Cal’s) longest-tenured coach before retiring after 33 years at the helm of the Golden Bears men’s swimming and diving program in 2007.

Before coaching at Cal, Thornton started Foothill Aquatic Club in 1960, which later became Los Altos Mountain View Aquatic Club.

Thornton, who started his Cal career in 1974-75, guided the Bears to the 1979 and 1980 NCAA team championships and built the program into a consistent national contender. Thornton’s teams finished ranked inside the top 10 in the national polls in 28 of the 33 years he was head coach. His Cal squads won 48 NCAA individual and relay championships and 108 Pac-10 individual, relay and diving titles, while owning a dual-meet record of 231-85 (.731) during his tenure. His 1979-80 and 1980-81 teams captured Pac-10 team championships.

Thornton was named National Coach of the Year twice and was a four-time selection as Pac-10 Coach of the Year. He was inducted into the International Swimming Hall of Fame in 1995 and into the Cal Athletics Hall of Fame in 2010. A past president of the American Swimming Coaches Association, Thornton served on the ASCA Board of Directors and is a past member of the NCAA Rules Committee. He was awarded the National Collegiate and Scholastic Award for his contributions to swimming as a healthful recreation activity for schools and colleges.

While at Cal’s helm, Thornton produced a long list of elite Olympians, including 11-time medalist and former world record-holder Matt Biondi, four-time medalist Anthony Ervin, Swedish gold medalists Par Arvidsson and Bengt Baron, and Croatian silver medalist Duje Draganja, among others. He also recruited and coached Nathan Adrian and Milorad Cavic, both of whom went on to Olympic success after Thornton retired.

Golden Bears who swam under Thornton amassed 29 Olympic medals, including 14 gold, 10 silver and five bronze, while representing several countries at the Olympic Games.

At the international level, Thornton coached numerous United States teams in world competition. He coached the U.S. in the 1979 FINA Cup in Tokyo, Japan, before leading the U.S. at the 1981 World University Games. In the summer of 1983, Thornton was an assistant coach for the U.S. at the Pan American Games in Caracas, Venezuela. He later served in the same capacity at the 1986 and 1987 World Championships, as well as the 1997 Pan Pacific Games.

Thornton graduated from San Jose State in 1956 with a degree in education and earned his master’s degree from Stanford.
He has died on Thursday, April 22, 2021.  He was 87.

REMEMBERING NORT THORNTON

“I’m saddened by the loss of Nort Thornton, a legend who impacted our program, our Cal community and the sport of swimming as a whole in so many tremendous ways. Nort will be remembered as one of our sport’s greatest coaches, but his legacy extends much further than the accolades he received throughout his career. He was a passionate leader who made a difference in the lives of everyone who spent time with him on the pool deck. Nort will be greatly missed, and I join all members of our Cal community in sending condolences and prayers to his family.”

--– Cal Men’s Swimming & Diving Head Coach David Durden

Awards
 2002 - Inducted into the American Swimming Coaches Association Hall of Fame
 1995 - Inducted into the International Swimming Hall of Fame

See also
 List of members of the International Swimming Hall of Fame

References

California Golden Bears swimming coaches
American swimming coaches
Living people
Year of birth missing (living people)
Place of birth missing (living people)